Sony Studios may refer to:

Sony Music Studios, a former music studio
Sony Pictures, a film studio company
Sony Pictures Studios, a film studio complex owned by Sony Pictures